In computer technology, transfers per second and its more common secondary terms gigatransfers per second (abbreviated as GT/s) and megatransfers per second (MT/s) are informal language that refer to the number of operations transferring data that occur in each second in some given data-transfer channel. It is also known as sample rate, i.e. the number of data samples captured per second, each sample normally occurring at the clock edge. The terms are neutral with respect to the method of physically accomplishing each such data-transfer operation; nevertheless, they are most commonly used in the context of transmission of digital data. 1 MT/s is 106 or one million transfers per second; similarly, 1 GT/s means 109, or equivalently in the US/short scale, one billion transfers per second.

Units
The choice of the symbol T for transfer conflicts with the International System of Units, in which T stands for the tesla unit of magnetic flux density (so "Megatesla per second" would be a reasonable unit to describe the rate of a rapidly changing magnetic field, such as in a pulsed field magnet or kicker magnet).

These terms alone do not specify the bit rate at which binary data is being transferred because they do not specify the number of bits transferred in each transfer operation (known as the channel width or word length). In order to calculate the data transmission rate, one must multiply the transfer rate by the information channel width. For example, a data bus eight-bytes wide (64 bits) by definition transfers eight bytes in each transfer operation; at a transfer rate of 1 GT/s, the data rate would be 8 × 109 B/s, i.e. 8 GB/s, or approximately 7.45 GiB/s. The bit rate for this example is 64 Gbit/s (8 × 8 × 109 bit/s).

The formula for a data transfer rate is: Channel width (bits/transfer) × transfers/second = bits/second.

Expanding the width of a channel, for example that between a CPU and a northbridge, increases data throughput without requiring an increase in the channel's operating frequency (measured in transfers per second). This is analogous to increasing throughput by increasing bandwidth but leaving latency unchanged.

The units usually refer to the "effective" number of transfers, or transfers perceived from "outside" of a system or component, as opposed to the internal speed or rate of the clock of the system. One example is a computer bus running at double data rate where data is transferred on both the rising and falling edge of the clock signal. If its internal clock runs at 100 MHz, then the effective rate is 200 MT/s, because there are 100 million rising edges per second and 100 million falling edges per second of a clock signal running at 100 MHz.

Buses like SCSI and PCI fall in the megatransfer range of data transfer rate, while newer bus architectures like the PCI-X, PCI Express, Ultra Path, and HyperTransport / Infinity Fabric operate at the gigatransfer rate.

See also
 Data-rate units
 Data transmission, also known as digital transmission
 File transfer
 
 Parallel port
 Symbol rate (baud)

References
 
 
 What does GT/s mean, anyway?

Computer performance